There are a number of books on British railway accidents which provide aid in the systematic study of the causes and effects of accidents, and their prevention.  There are common themes in many accidents (see Classification). Key books are listed here to avoid repeating them for each individual accident.

The doyen is L. T. C. Rolt's Red for Danger, first published in 1956, which takes a wide-ranging overview of over 100 accidents.  Most other books concentrate on a smaller number of specific accidents, described in more detail.  O.S. Nock's "Historic Railway Disasters" combines both approaches, with individual chapters on especially significant accidents such as Armagh and Quintinshill.  For accidents in the last 30 years and modern operating practice, Stanley Hall's four books are particularly good.  Apart from Schneider and Mase (1968/1970) and Faith (2001), all the books below are confined to British accidents.

The list below does not include books on individual accidents; for these, see Tay Bridge, Quintinshill, Harrow, Hixon, Moorgate and Lockington.

An extremely valuable source now on the Internet is the Railways Archive compilation of official Railway Inspectorate Accident Reports - see "External Links" below.

Key books
  First published 1998 to accompany the Channel 4 series.  An overall survey like Rolt's, but covering worldwide accidents.
   A broad survey, concentrating especially on accidents in the 20 years up to 1986, especially those caused by drivers' and signalmen's errors.
   Covers Clapham Junction, Purley, Glasgow Bellgrove and a wide range of other accidents, e.g. track problems, fires, staff fatalities.
  Covers the period 1989-97 including Cowden, Newton and Southall.
 .  Includes Ladbroke Grove, Hatfield, Potters Bar, Great Heck (Selby). 
  Covers 27 accidents between 1905 and 1962. Particularly good on the human factor and psychological reasons behind accidents.
   First published 1966, another well-written classic.
   An excellent overview of accidents up to 1957, in fine writing style. An early reviewer wrote, "At the risk of being thought callous, one must praise Mr Rolt for making death and disaster most attractive reading". Several revised and updated editions published (1960, 1966, 1976, 1982).  Later editions have material added by G.M. Kichenside.
  
   Includes classification and numerous European accidents. 
   Written by a former signalman, with an interesting selection including some less well-known mishaps.
  covers 47 accidents between 1876 and 1991 with many photographs.
  19 modern accidents in the period 1975-97.  Like his previous book, contains some trenchant comments on railway management.

External links
Railway Archive- Accident Report.
Early railways in the UK and USA by Charles Adams (published in 1879)
Office of the Railway Regulator Reports on major incidents
UK Rail Accident Investigation Branch Publications - Covers the period from  2006 onward. Note as well as major accidents there are reports on relatively minor incidents.

Railway accidents and incidents in the United Kingdom
Lists of books
British railway-related lists